New Stories from the South is an annual compilation of short stories published by Algonquin Books of Chapel Hill between 1986 and 2010 and billed as the year's best stories written by Southern writers or about the Southern United States. The stories are collected from more than 100 literary magazines, including The Atlantic, Harper's Magazine, The New Yorker, the Oxford American, The Paris Review, Ploughshares, and The Southern Review. Shannon Ravenel, then the editor of the annual Best American Short Stories anthology, launched the New Stories from the South series in 1986 and compiled and edited every volume until 2006. To mark the third decade of the series, Algonquin invited author and John Simon Guggenheim Fellow Allan Gurganus to be guest editor.

New Stories from the South has collected the work of many prominent modern American writers, including Steve Almond, Russell Banks, John Barth, Madison Smartt Bell, Wendell Berry, Roy Blount Jr., Larry Brown, James Lee Burke, Robert Olen Butler, Andre Dubus, William Faulkner (a newly discovered story), Barry Hannah, Nanci Kincaid, Aaron Gwyn, Barbara Kingsolver, Bobbie Ann Mason, Reynolds Price, Keith Lee Morris, John Sayles, Lucy Corin, Lee Smith, and Peter Taylor.

List of Compilations and Stories

New Stories from the South: The Year's Best, 1986. Edited by Shannon Ravenel. .
 Bridging by Max Apple
 Triptych by Madison Smartt Bell
 Tongues of Flame by Mary Ward Brown
 Communion by Suzanne Brown
 The Convict by James Lee Burke
 Air by Ron Carlson
 Says Velma by Doug Crowell
 Martha Jean by Leon V. Driskell
 The World Record Holder by Elizabeth Harris
 Something Good for Ginnie by Mary Hood
 Summer of the Magic Show by David Huddle
 Holding on by Gloria Norris
 Umpire by Kurt Rheinheimer
 Delivery by W.A. Smith
 Something to Lose by Wallace Whatley
 Wallwork by Luke Whisnant
 Chicken Simon by Sylvia Wilkinson

New Stories from the South: The Year's Best, 1987. Edited by Shannon Ravenel. .
 Across from the Motoheads by Luke Whisnant
 Lady of Spain by Robert Taylor
 Heart by Marly Swick
 Life on the moon by Lee Smith
 Where Pelham fell by Bob Shacochis
 The Pure in heart by Peggy Payne
 Sugar, the eunuchs / and Big G.B. by Lewis Nordan
 Vincristine by Trudy Lewis
 After Moore by Mary Hood
 Dressed like Summer Leaves by Andre Dubus
 Magnolia by Vickie Covington
 Heroic Measures / Vital Signs by John William Corrington
 Peter the Rock by Rosanne Coggeshall
 Edward and Jill by Robert Boswell
 Dependents by James Gordon Bennett

New Stories from the South: The Year's Best, 1988. Edited by Shannon Ravenel. . 
 Happiness of the Garden Variety by Mark Richard
 Game Farm by John Rolfe Gardiner
 Half Measures by Trudy Lewis
 The Man who Knew Belle Starr by Richard Bausch
 First Union Blues by Jill McCorkle
 Voice by Eve Shelnutt
 Limited Access by Annette Sanford
 The Watch by Rick Bass
 George Bailey Fishing by Ellen Akins
 Rose-Johnny by Barbara Kingsolver
 Gas by Jim Hall
 Facing the Music by Larry Brown
 The Crumb by Sunny Rogers
 Belonging by Pam Durban
 Like the Old Wolf in all those Wolf Stories by Nanci Kincaid
 Metropolitan by Charlotte Holmes

New Stories from the South: The Year's Best, 1989. Edited by Shannon Ravenel. .
 Preface by Shannon Ravenel
 A Hank of Hair, a Piece of Bone by Lewis Nordan
 Six White Horses by Annette Sanford
 Samaritans by Larry Brown
 Wish by Bobbie Ann Mason
 Customs of the Country by Madison Smartt Bell
 Playing by David Huddle
 Coupon for Blood by Sandy Huss
 Hot Springs by Paula Sharp
 Wild Horses by Rick Bass
 Where She Was by Kelly Cherry
 Strays by Mark Richard
 Pacific Theater by James Gordon Bennett
 The Rain of Terror by Frank Manley
 Homes by Kurt Rheinheimer
 It Wasn't All Dancing by Mary Ward Brown

New Stories from the South: The Year's Best, 1990. Edited by Shannon Ravenel. .
 Spittin' Image of a Baptist boy by Nanci Kincaid
 The Cellar of Runt Conroy by Lewis Nordan
 Family by Lance Olsen
 Feast of the Earth, Ransom of the Clay by Mark Richard
 Just Outside the B.T. by Moira Crone
 The Kind of Light that shines on Texas by Reginald McKnight
 Letter to the lady of the house by Richard Bausch
 The Boarder by Greg Johnson
 Crow Man by Tom Bailey
 Changing Names by Clyde Edgerton
 Les Femme Creoles by Bob Shacochis
 Zoe by Molly Best Tinsley
 Where we land by Ron Robinson
 Sleep by Larry Brown
 Fishbone by Donna Trussell
 The History of Rodney by Rick Bass
 
New Stories from the South: The Year's Best, 1991. Edited by Shannon Ravenel. .
 Cousin Aubrey by Peter Taylor
 The Arabesque by Barbara Hudson
 Intensive Care by Lee Smith
 The Screened Porch by Susan Starr Richards
 Relic by Robert Olen Butler
 With Jazz by Bobbie Ann Mason
 A Life or Death Matter by Elizabeth Hunnewell
 Big Bad Love by Larry Brown
 South of Kittatinny by Hilding Johnson
 The Birds for Christmas by Mark Richard
 Poinsett's Bridge by Robert Morgan
 Waiting for Hard Times to End by Jill McCorkle
 Black Cat Bone by Thomas Phillips Brewer
 In the Loyal Mountains by Rick Bass
 This is not the Picture Show by Nanci Kincaid
 His Final Mother by Reynolds Price

New Stories from the South: The Year's Best, 1992. Edited by Shannon Ravenel. .
 The Bubba Stories by Lee Smith
 Lilacs by Abraham Verghese
 A New Life by Mary Ward Brown
 A Sturdy Pair of Shoes that Fit Good by Nanci Kincaid
 Death Crown by Robert Morgan
 Clearwater and Latissimus by Alison Baker
 The Winnowing of Mrs. Schuping by Padgett Powell
 Texas City, 1947 by James Lee Burke
 Quitting Smoking by Reginald McKnight
 Explaining Death to the Dog by Susan Perabo
 A Good Scent from a Strange Mountain by Robert Olen Butler
 The Witch of Owl Mountain Springs: An Account of Her Remarkable Powers by Peter Taylor
 Economics by Elizabeth Seydel Morgan
 Like Hands on a Cave Wall by Karen Minton
 A Roadside Resurrection by Larry Brown
 You have Chosen Cake by Dan Leone
 After Memphis by Patricia Lear

New Stories from the South: The Year's Best, 1993. Edited by Shannon Ravenel. .
 Marie by Edward Jones
 Charlotte by Tony Earley
 Selling Whiskers by Barbara Hudson
 Spinach by Dan Leone
 Evening by Richard Bausch
 Man Watcher by Jill McCorkle
 Trouble at the Home Office by David Huddle
 Family Planning by Elizabeth Hunnewell
 Helens and Roses by Annette Sanford
 The Waiting Room by Peter Taylor
 Rescuing Ed by Dennis Loy Johnson
 A Jonquil for Mary Penn by Wendell Berry
 Bounty by Pinckney Benedict
 Name Me this River by Kevin Calder
 White Boys and River Girls by Paula K. Gover
 Prisoners by Wayne Karlin
 Preparation by Robert Olen Butler
 Major Six Pockets by Lee Merrill Byrd

New Stories from the South: The Year's Best, 1994. Edited by Shannon Ravenel. .
 Nicodemus Bluff by Barry Hannah
 My Other Life by Melanie Sumner
 My Mother's Shoes by Robert Love Taylor
 Outlaw Head & Tail by George Singleton
 Pretending the Bed was a Raft by Nanci Kincaid
 Retreat by Frederick Barthelme
 Dark Corner by Robert Morgan
 Landscape and Dream by Nancy Krusoe
 The Palace Thief by Ethan Canin
 The Heart Must from its Breaking by Leon Rooke
 Deeds of Light by Reynolds Price
 Luxury by Kathleen Cushman
 Peeling by John Sayles
 Aren't You Happy for Me? by Richard Bausch
 Sweet Tooth by Pamela Erbe
 The Prophet from Jupiter by Tony Earley

New Stories from the South: The Year's Best, 1995. Edited by Shannon Ravenel. .
 Water people by James Lee Burke
 Gravity by Susan Perabo
 Bases by Scott Gould
 In the distance by Caroline A. Langston
 Teams by Lynn Marie
 The runaways by Elizabeth Spencer
 The bug man by Tim Gautreaux
 Fixing Lu by M.M.M. Hayes
 The Stucco house by Ellen Gilchrist
 Ladies of the marble hearth by Hillary Hebert
 Riding with the doctor by R. Sebastian Bennett
 Boy born with tattoo of Elvis by Robert Olen Butler
 Everything quiet like church by Dale Ray Phillips
 Paying attention by Ken Craven
 I am the bear by Wendy Brenner
 Drummer down by Barry Hannah
 Gravity by Jesse Lee Kercheval

New Stories from the South: The Year's Best, 1996. Edited by Shannon Ravenel. .
 Rose of Lebanon by William Faulkner
 Gauguin by Moira Crone
 Paradise by Jill McCorkle
 The host by Marcia Guthridge
 Jealous husband returns in form of parrot by Robert Olen Butler
 Some say the world by Susan Perabo
 Goose girl by Annette Sanford
 The happy memories club by Lee Smith
 A happy, safe thing by Kathy Flann
 The Balm of Gilead tree by Robert Morgan
 Died and gone to Vegas by Tim Gautreaux
 Cool moss by David Gilbert
 General Markman's last stand by Tom Paine
 Mood music by J.D. Dolan
 Grant by Ellen Douglas

Best of the South: From Ten Years of New Stories from the South. 1997. Selected and introduced by Anne Tyler. .
 Martha Jean by Leon V. Driskell
 After moore by Mary Hood
 Where pelham fell by Bob Shacochis
 Heart by Marly Swick
 Watch by Rick Bass
 Customs of the country by Madison Smartt Bell
 Rain of terror by Frank Manley
 Hank of hair, a piece of bone by Lewis Nordan
 Letter to the lady of the house by Richard Bausch
 Kind of light that shines on Texas by Reginald McKnight
 This is not the picture show by Nanci Kincaid
 Birds for Christmas by Mark Richard
 Intensive care by Lee Smith
 After Memphis by Patricia Lear
 Winnowing of Mrs. Schuping by Padgett Powell
 Charlotte by Tony Earley
 Marie by Edward P. Jones
 Nicodemus bluff by Barry Hannah
 My other life by Melanie Sumner
 Water people by James Lee Burke

New Stories from the South: The Year's Best, 1997. Edited by Shannon Ravenel with a preface by Robert Olen Butler. .
 Corporal Love by Dale Ray Phillips
 Ramone by Judy Troy
 Help me fine my spaceman lover by Robert Olen Butler
 The taxi ride by Patricia Elam Ruff
 Little frogs in a ditch by Tim Gautreaux
 After the opera by Marc Vassallo
 The Green Suit by Dwight Allen
 Gravity by Pam Durban
 Native daughter by Lee Smith
 Along a wider river by Janice Daugharty
 Ashes north by Edward Allen
 Julia and Nellie by Ellen Douglas
 The finest wife by Elizabeth Gilbert
 Simpler components by Lucy Hochman
 Marrying Aunt Sadie by Gene Able
 Mojo farmer by Brad Vice
 The half-pint by Beauvais McCaddon
 Every building wants to fall by Rhian Margaret Ellis
 Pavane for a dead princess by Charles East

New Stories from the South: The Year's Best, 1998. Edited by Shannon Ravenel with a preface by Padgett Powell. .
 Yellow Jack by John Russell
 Rita's mystery by John Holman
 Memorial Day by Mark Richard
 The baker's wife by Sara Powers
 The lesson by Frederick Barthelme
 Aliens of affection by Padgett Powell
 Where words go by Michael Gills
 In the Little Hunky River by Annette Sanford
 Girls like you by Jennifer Moses
 The poet by Stephen Dixon
 Nipple by Wendy Brenner
 Sorry blood by Tim Gautreaux
 The other mother by Enid Shomer
 The only way to ride by Molly Best Tinsley
 Bridge by Tony Earley
 The order of things by Nancy Richard
 These people are us by George Singleton
 Naked as Tanya by Stephen Marion
 Talk radio by Scott Ely

New Stories from the South: The Year's Best, 1999. Edited by Shannon Ravenel with a preface by Tony Earley. .
 Birdland by Michael Knight
 Fla. boys by Heather Sellers
 Lunch at the Piccadilly by Clyde Edgerton
 Those deep elm Brown's ferry blues by William Gay
 Missy by Richard Bausch
 Caulk by George Singleton
 Borrowed hearts by Rick DeMarinis
 The human side of instrumental transcommunication by Wendy Brenner
 Pagan babies by Ingrid Hill
 Leaving Venice, Florida by Richard Schmitt
 Storytelling by Mary Gordon
 Krista had a treble clef rose by Mary Clyde
 Booker T's coming home by Laura Payne Butler
 Beyond the point by Michael Erard
 Miracle boy by Pinckney Benedict
 Neighborhood by Kurt Rheinheimer
 Little bitty pretty one by Andrew Alexander
 Name of love by Janice Daugharty
 Quill by Tony Earley
 Poachers by Tom Franklin

New Stories from the South: The Year's Best, 2000. Edited by Shannon Ravenel with a preface by Ellen Douglas. .
 A Note to Biographers Regarding Famous Author Flannery O'Connor by Mary Helen Stefaniak
 Sheep by Thomas H. McNeely
 In the Doorway of Rhee's Jazz Joint by D. Winston Brown
 Dancing with the One-Armed Gal by Tim Gautreaux
 Box by A. Manette Ansay
 The Best Friend by Chris Offutt
 Heavy Metal by Robert Olen Butler
 My Hand is Just Fine Where it is by William Gay
 Mr. Puniverse by Wendy Brenner
 The Thing with Willie by Karen Sagstetter
 Good-hearted Woman by Melanie Sumner
 The Widow by Romulus Linney
 He's at the Office by Allan Gurganus
 Wave by John Holman
 Debra's Flap and Snap by Clyde Edgerton
 The Circus House by Cathy Day
 Just Married by Tony Earley
 Rhonda and her Children by Christopher Miner
 Forgetting the End of the World by R.H.W. Dillard
 How to Tell a Story by Margo Rabb

New Stories from the South: The Year's Best, 2001. Edited by Shannon Ravenel with a preface by Lee Smith. .
 Where what gets into people comes from by Moira Crone
 The Saturday morning car wash club by James Ellis Thomas
 The hero of loneliness by Christie Hodgen
 Make a wish by Elizabeth Tippens
 Jolie-Gray by Ingrid Hill
 Inappropriate babies by Linda Wendling
 I am not like Nuñez by Jane R. Shippen
 Public relations by George Singleton
 The paperhanger by William Gay
 Pink miracle in East Tennessee by Robert Love Taylor
 Jesus is sending you this message by Jim Grimsley
 In between things by Marshall Boswell
 The whimsied world by Nicola Mason
 Two lives by Madison Smartt Bell
 Father judge run by Carrie Brown
 Skin deep by Edith Pearlman
 Shoes by Kurt Rheinheimer
 Hunting country by Stephen Coyne
 The rest of your life by John Barth

New Stories from the South: The Year's Best, 2002. Edited by Shannon Ravenel with a preface by Larry Brown. .
 Tennessee by Romulus Linney
 End of the steam age by Dwight Allen
 Charting the territories of the red by William Gay
 The unripe heart by Max Steele
 Of falling by Aaron Gwyn
 The rat spoon by Dulane Upshaw Ponder
 Anthropology by Andrea Lee
 Aboveground by Doris Betts
 I have lost my right by R. T. Smith
 Beneath the deep, slow motion by Brad Barkley
 The more they stay the same by Ingrid Hill
 Maximum sunlight by Kate Small
 Show-and-tell by George Singleton
 Pilgrims by Julie Orringer
 Big bend by Bill Roorback
 The Outer Banks by Russell Banks
 The growth and death of Buddy Gardner by Corey Mesler
 The bone divers by David Koon
 Faith healer by Lucia Nevai

New Stories from the South: The Year's Best, 2003. Edited by Shannon Ravenel with a preface by Roy Blount, Jr. .
 For those of us who need such things by Brock Clarke
 Nirvana by Patricia Lear
 Cool wedding by Latha Viswanathan
 Dying light by Donald Hays
 Inside out by Chris Offutt
 Johnny too bad by John Dufresne
 Rich people by Lucy Corin
 Report from Junction by Brad Vice
 The ballad of Rappy Valcour by Ingrid Hill
 The soul molecule by Steve Almond
 The faithful by Paul Prather
 Ellen's book by Michael Knight
 Every tongue shall confess by ZZ Packer
 Corpus by Brett Anthony Johnston
 Keegan's load by Mark Winegardner
 Off Island by Michael Parker
 Compassion by Dorothy Allison
 Unheard music by Peter Meinke

New Stories from the South: The Year's Best, 2004. Edited by Shannon Ravenel with a preface by Tim Gautreaux. .
 A rich man by Edward P. Jones
 A family of breast feeders by Starkey Flythe, Jr.
 Second hand by Chris Offutt
 Valor by Ingrid Hill
 Best cousin by Tayari Jones
 Raise children here by George Singleton
 Pagans by Rick Bass
 The judgement of Paris by K.A. Longstreet
 The Lolita School by Brock Clarke
 Coal smoke by Silas House
 Dog song by Ann Pancake
 Love is gnats today by Drew Perry
 Feeling lucky by Michael Knight
 Saturday afternoon in the Holocaust Museum by Elizabeth Seydel Morgan
 One summer by Annette Sanford
 Intervention by Jill McCorkle
 The widow by Bret Anthony Johnston
 Docent by R.T. Smith

New Stories from the South: The Year's Best, 2005. Edited by Shannon Ravenel with a preface by Jill McCorkle. .
 Hidden meanings : treatment of time, supreme irony, and life experiences in the song "Ain't gonna bump no more no big fat woman" by Michael Parker
 The boucherie by Stephanie Soileau
 Until Gwen by Dennis Lehane
 The kindest cut by Judy Budnitz
 The burning of the flag by James Lee Burke
 Mr. Sender by Moira Crone
 Severance by Robert Olen Butler
 Jane's hat by Cary Holladay
 The dream lover by Lucinda Harrison Coffman
 Nap time by Tom Franklin
 Anything that floats by Bret Anthony Johnston
 Clairvoyant by Ada Long
 The charm of the highway median by Ethan Hauser
 The pantyhose man by Rebecca Soppe
 My heart is a snake farm by Allan Gurganus
 Good witch, bad witch by Gregory Sanders
 The choir director affair (the baby's teeth) by Kevin Wilson
 The boy in the tree by Elizabeth Spencer
 Dumdum by Janice Daugharty

Best of the South: From the Second Decade of New Stories from the South. 2005. Edited by Shannon Ravenel; selected and introduced by Anne Tyler. .
 The host by Marcia Guthridge
 The Happy Memories Club by Lee Smith
 Ramone by Judy Troy
 Gravity by Pam Durban
 Memorial Day by Mark Richard
 Talk radio by Scott Ely
 Birdland by Michael Knight
 Fla. boys by Heather Sellers
 Those Deep Elm Brown's Ferry blues by William Gay
 Sheep by Thomas H. McNeely
 Debra's flap and snap by Clyde Edgerton
 Jesus is sending you this message by Jim Grimsley
 Hunting country by Stephen Coyne
 The unripe heart by Max Steele
 Faith healer by Lucia Nevai
 The faithful by Paul Prather
 Second hand by Chris Offutt
 Intervention by Jill McCorkle
 Good witch, bad witch by Gregory Sanders
 The boucherie by Stephanie Soileau
 Appendix: New Stories from the South, 1986-2005.

New Stories from the South: The Year's Best, 2006. Edited by Alan Gurganus and Kathy Pories with a preface by Alan Gurganus. .
 Yard art by Tony Earley
 The burning by Cary Holladay
 Mike by Wendell Berry
 Tunneling to the center of the earth by Kevin Wilson
 Amanuensis by J.D. Chapman
 Money whipped by William Harrison
 Grove by Erin Brooks Worley
 Director's cut by George Singleton
 Kids make their own houses by Geoff Wyss
 Tired Heart by Keith Lee Morris
 The music you never hear by Quinn Dalton
 Blue knights bounced from CVD tourney by Chris Bachelder
 You love that dog by Mary Helen Stefaniak
 Justice by Daniel Wallace
 Fill in the blank by Enid Shomer
 How to build a house by Luke Whisnant
 The currency of love by Nanci Kincaid
 Tastes like chicken by R.T. Smith
 Brief encounters with Che Guevara by Ben Fountain
 Jubilation, Florida by N.M. Kelby

New Stories from the South: The Year's Best, 2007. Edited by Edward P. Jones. .
 Goats by Rick Bass
 A season of regret by James Lee Burke
 The ice garden by Moira Crone
 Ghost town choir by Joshua Ferris
 The safe by Tim Gautreaux
 Fourteen feet of water in my house by Allan Gurganus
 Hollyhocks by Cary Holladay
 At the Powwow Hotel by Toni Jensen
 Life expectancy by Holly Goddard Jones
 Beauty and virtue by Agustin Maes
 Dogs with human faces by Stephen Marion
 One day this will all be yours by Philipp Meyer
 Jakob Loomis by Jason Ockert
 Which rocks we choose by George Singleton
 Story by R.T. Smith
 Bela Lugosi's dead by Angela Threatt
 A terrible thing by Daniel Wallace
 Unassigned territory by Stephanie Powell Watts

New Stories from the South 2008: The Year's Best. Edited by ZZ Packer and Kathy Pories with an introduction by ZZ Packer. .
 Theory of realty by Holly Goddard Jones
 Bridge of Sighs by Pinckney Benedict
 The ease of living by Amina Gautier
 First marriage by Kevin Moffett
 The unnecessary man by Robert Drummond
 So this is permanence by Stephanie Soileau
 The great speckled bird by Clyde Edgerton
 Back of beyond by Ron Rash
 Suck it by Merritt Tierce
 Wretch like me by R.T. Smith
 Candidate by Karen E. Bender
 Lizard man by David James Poissant
 The girls by Daniel Wallace
 First husband, first wife by Jim Tomlinson
 Republican by Bret Anthony Johnston
 Leak by Mary Miller
 Albemarle by Charlie Smith
 Child of God by Jennifer Moses
 Lucky seven & Dalloway by Stephanie Dickinson
 Andrea is changing her name by Kevin Brockmeier

New Stories from the South 2009: The Year's Best. Edited by Madison Smartt Bell and Kathy Pories with an introduction by with an introduction by Madison Smartt Bell. .
 Muscle memory by Katherine Karlin
 Banger finds out by Kelly Cherry
 Touch touch me by Stephen Marion
 Family museum of the ancient postcards by Stephanie Powell Watts
 Child of God by Geoff Wyss
 Coast by Charlotte Holmes
 No joke, this is going to be painful by Kevin Wilson
 The camera obscura by Stephanie Soileau
 Magic words by Jill McCorkle
 Some thing blue by Tayari Jones
 Love city by Stephanie Dickinson
 Grand old party by Michael Knight
 Quarantine by Rahul Mehta
 Sightings by Elizabeth Spencer
 Between wrecks by George Singleton
 The world, the flesh, and the devil by Pinckney Benedict
 Night glow by Holly Wilson
 Bird dog by Clinton J. Stewart
 Horse people by Cary Holladay
 Fly away, breath by Wendell Berry
 The elderberries by Juyanne James

New Stories from the South: The Year's Best, 2010. Edited by Amy Hempel and Kathy Pories with an introduction by Amy Hempel. .
 New Year's Weekend on the Hand Surgery Ward, Old Pilgrims' Hospital, Naples, Italy by Adam Atlas
 Fish story by Rick Bass
 Noon by Brad Watson
 Someone ought to tell her there's nowhere to go by Danielle Evans
 The ascent by Ron Rash
 Small and heavy world by Ashleigh Pedersen
 A burden by Wendell Berry
 The cow that milked herself by Megan Mayhew Bergman
 Columbarium by George Singleton
 Caiman by Bret Anthony Johnston
 Eraser by Ben Stroud
 Housewarming by Kevin Wilson
 Jason who will be famous by Dorothy Allison
 Arsonists by Ann Pancake
 Drive by Aaron Gwyn
 The green belt by Emily Quinlan
 The coldest night of the twentieth century by Stephen Marion
 Cry for help from France by Padgett Powell
 Nightblooming by Kenneth Calhoun
 Discovered America by Marjorie Kemper
 Return trip by Elizabeth Spencer
 Idols by Tim Gautreaux
 This trembling earth by Laura Lee Smith
 Visitation by Brad Watson
 Retreat by Wells Tower

Resource 
Shannon Ravenel (editor), New Stories from the South, (Chapel Hill: Algonquin Books of Chapel Hill, 2005).

2005 books
Algonquin Books books